Michelangelo Fardella (1650 – January 2, 1718) was an Italian scientist.

Fardella was born at Trapani, Sicily, and died in Naples. He was a member of the Order of Friars Minor. He excelled in physics and mathematics, and was both the chair of philosophy in Modena and of astronomy and philosophy in Padua. He embraced the philosophy of René Descartes, after learning the principles during a voyage which he made to Paris (1678) from conversations with Antoine Arnauld, Nicolas Malebranche and Bernard Lamy.

His principal works are:
 Universæ philosophiæ systema, Venice, 1691, in-12
 Universæ usualis mathematicæ theoria, 1691

1650 births
1718 deaths
People from Trapani
17th-century Italian scientists